Jim Tracy may refer to: 

 Jim Tracy (baseball) (born 1955), baseball manager and player
 Jim Tracy (politician) (born 1956), Tennessee Director for Rural Development
 Jim Tracy (ski), head coach of the U.S women's ski team

See also 
 James Tracy (disambiguation)